Hallelujah Nights is the debut studio album by American country music band LANCO. It was released on January 19, 2018 via Arista Nashville. The album includes the singles "Long Live Tonight", "Greatest Love Story", and "Born to Love You".

Critical reception
The album received three out of five stars from Stephen Thomas Erlewine of AllMusic, who wrote that the band is "designed for mass appeal, so it's fortunate that Hallelujah Nights is built for the long haul: its hooks are sturdy, the production gleams, and the quintet is amiable and ingratiating."

Commercial performance
The album debuted at No. 1 on Billboards Top Country Albums, with 13,000 copies (19,000 album equivalent units total) sold in the first week. As of January 2018, the album has sold 47,900 copies in the United States.

Track listing

Personnel
Adapted from AllMusic

Lanco
Chandler Baldwin - bass guitar, background vocals
Jared Hampton - banjo, Hammond B-3 organ, keyboards, mandolin, background vocals
Tripp Howell - drums, background vocals
Brandon Lancaster - acoustic guitar, lead vocals, background vocals
Eric Steedly - electric guitar, background vocals

Additional Musicians
Fred Eltringham - drums, percussion
Jason Hall - background vocals
Jaxon Hargrove - acoustic guitar, vibraphone, background vocals
Jay Joyce - bass guitar, clapping, dobro, Fender Rhodes, acoustic guitar, electric guitar, Hammond B-3 organ, keyboards, percussion, programming, vibraphone, background vocals
Michael Joyce - bass guitar
Mickey Raphael - harmonica
Paul Simmons - drums
Jeremy Spillman - background vocals
Tiffany Trotter - spoken word

Charts

Weekly charts

Year-end charts

References

2018 debut albums
Lanco (band) albums
Arista Nashville albums
Albums produced by Jay Joyce